Kennet River or Kennett River may refer to:

 Kennet River (New Zealand)
 Kennet River (Victoria), Australia
 Kennett River, Victoria, a settlement in Victoria, Australia

See also
 River Kennet, Berkshire, England
 River Kennett, Suffolk, England
 Kennet (disambiguation)